Tiquilia is a genus of flowering plants in the borage family, Boraginaceae. The 27 species in this genus are known by the common name crinklemat. They are native to the Western Hemisphere and are mostly found in desert regions.

Selected species
 Tiquilia canescens (DC.) A.T.Richardson. – woody crinklemat
 Tiquilia darwinii (Hook.f.) A.T.Richardson
 Tiquilia fusca Hook.f.
 Tiquilia galapagoa (J.T.Howell) A.T.Richardson
 Tiquilia gossypina (Woot. & Standl.)  A.T.Richardson. – Texas crinklemat
 Tiquilia greggii (Torr. & A.Gray)  A.T.Richardson. – plumed crinklemat
 Tiquilia hispidissima (Torr. & A.Gray)  A.T.Richardson. – hairy crinklemat
 Tiquilia latior (I.M.Johnst.) A.T.Richardson. – matted crinklemat
 Tiquilia mexicana (S.Watson)  A.T.Richardson. – Mexican crinklemat
 Tiquilia nesiotica (J.T.Howell) A.T.Richardson – Gray Matplant
 Tiquilia nuttallii (Benth.) A. T. Richardson – Nuttall's crinklemat
 Tiquilia palmeri (A.Gray)  A.T.Richardson. – Palmer's crinklemat
 Tiquilia paronychoides (Phil.) A.T.Richardson. – Peruvian sand flower
 Tiquilia plicata (Torr.)  A.T.Richardson. – plaited crinklemat, fanleaf crinklemat

References

External links

USDA Plants Profile for Tiquilia
Jepson Manual Treatment of Tiquilia

 
Boraginaceae genera
Flora of North America
North American desert flora
Taxonomy articles created by Polbot